Noailles may refer to:

Places in France
 Noailles, Corrèze, in the Corrèze department
 Noailles, Oise, in the Oise department
 Noailles, Tarn, in the Tarn department
 Noailles, Marseille, a neighborhood and metro station of the 1st arrondissement of Marseille

People
 Three 16th century French diplomatic brothers:
 Antoine de Noailles (1504–1562), Sieur de Noailles, admiral of France
 François de Noailles (1519–1585), Papal Prothonotary, Bishop and French ambassador
 Gilles de Noailles (1524–1600), French Ambassador to the Ottoman Empire
 Duke of Noailles, a French peerage created in 1663 including a long list of members of the Noailles family
 Anna de Noailles (1876-1933), Romanian-French poet and writer